The Keya Paha River is a river flowing  through the U.S. states of South Dakota and Nebraska.

The name is derived from the Dakota language ke'-ya pa-ha&apos;, meaning "turtle hill", specifically Turtle Butte. The river's name was given to Keya Paha County, Nebraska, through which it flows.

The river originates in Todd County in south central South Dakota, at the confluence of Antelope Creek and Rock Creek near the town of Hidden Timber. It flows in a generally southeasterly direction through Todd and Tripp counties in South Dakota and then through Keya Paha and Boyd counties in Nebraska. The river has a year-round flow, except for winter ice, and has a quality of water better than all other South Dakota rivers.

In 1861, the border between the Nebraska and Dakota territories followed the Keya Paha River from the 43rd parallel to the river's confluence with the Niobrara; it then followed the Niobrara to Missouri.  This situation lasted until 1882 when the boundary was changed to follow the 43rd parallel all the way to Missouri; the change added portions of Keya Paha and Boyd counties to Nebraska.

Discharge
From July 22 to July 30, 1976, the discharge was recorded as zero.

See also

List of rivers of South Dakota
List of rivers of Nebraska

References

Rivers of Nebraska
Rivers of South Dakota
Rivers of Boyd County, Nebraska
Rivers of Keya Paha County, Nebraska
Rivers of Todd County, South Dakota
Rivers of Tripp County, South Dakota